Umatilla County is one of the 36 counties in the U.S. state of Oregon. As of the 2020 census, the population was 80,075. Hermiston is the largest city in Umatilla County, but Pendleton remains the county seat.  Umatilla County is part of the Hermiston-Pendleton, OR Micropolitan Statistical Area, which has a combined population of 92,261. It is included in the eight-county definition of Eastern Oregon.

The county is named for the Umatilla River.

History
Umatilla County was created on September 27, 1862, out of a portion of Wasco County. Adjustments were made to the county's boundaries following the creation of Grant, Morrow, Union, and Wallowa Counties. This legislative act also designated Marshall Station as the temporary county seat. An 1865 election selected Umatilla City, now known as Umatilla, as the county seat. With the development of wheat farming, population shifted to the north and east parts of the county, and a subsequent election in 1868 moved the county seat again to Pendleton.

The Umatilla Indian Reservation was established by the Treaty of Walla Walla in 1855. The Umatillas, Walla Wallas, and Cayuse tribes were resettled there, and is located immediately southeast of Pendleton.

EZ Wireless of Hermiston officially opened on February 4, 2004, one of the largest known Wi-Fi wide area networks in the United States, covering parts of Umatilla County, Morrow County and Benton County, Washington. Although created to facilitate communications among local police, firemen and EMT workers who immediately respond to possible accidents or terrorist attacks on the Umatilla Chemical Depot, where the U.S. Army maintained a national arsenal of nerve gas, the network can be accessed in some places by the public for free.

Geography

It borders the Columbia River across from Washington.

Adjacent counties

Benton County, Washington (north)
Walla Walla County, Washington (north)
Columbia County, Washington (northeast)
Wallowa County (east)
Union County (east)
Grant County (south)
Morrow County (west)

National protected areas
Cold Springs National Wildlife Refuge
McKay Creek National Wildlife Refuge
Umatilla National Forest (part)
Whitman National Forest (part)

Demographics

2010 census
As of the 2010 census, 75,889 people, 26,904 households, and 18,647 families resided in the county. The racial makeup of the county was 79.1% White, 3.5% American Indian, 0.9% Asian, 0.8% Black or African American, 0.1% Pacific islander, 12.5% from other races, and 3.1% from two or more races. Those of Hispanic or Latino origin made up 23.9% of the population. In terms of ancestry, 21.4% were German, 12.8% were Irish, 11.6% were English, and 5.6% were American.

Of the 26,904 households, 36.4% had children under the age of 18 living with them, 50.9% were married couples living together, 12.0% had a female householder with no husband present, 30.7% were non-families, and 24.7% of all households were made up of individuals. The average household size was 2.67 and the average family size was 3.17. The median age was 35.7 years.

The median income for a household in the county was $45,861 and for a family was $53,585. Males had a median income of $39,288 versus $30,489 for females. The per capita income for the county was $20,035. About 11.0% of families and 15.8% of the population were below the poverty line, including 21.4% of those under age 18 and 9.5% of those age 65 or over.

2021 US Census American Community Survey- Household Incomes
Strong economic growth in the west end of the county has propelled Hermiston well past Pendleton with the highest median household incomes in Umatilla County.

Government and politics

State legislature
Umatilla County contains two Oregon State House Districts: State House District 57, which is currently represented by Greg Smith, and State House District 58, which is currently represented by Bobby Levy. Umatilla County is also located in the 29th District of the Oregon State Senate, represented by Bill Hansell. Smith, Levy, and Hansell are registered Republicans.

Board of commissioners
Umatilla County is represented and governed by three county commissioners. The Umatilla County Board of Commissioners is currently made up of Dan Dorran, John Shafer, and Cindy Timmons.

Make-up of Umatilla County voters

Like all counties in eastern Oregon, the majority of registered voters who are part of a political party in Umatilla County are members of the Republican Party. In the 2008 presidential election, 59.77% of Umatilla County voters voted for Republican John McCain, while 37.16% voted for Democrat Barack Obama and 3.07% of voters either voted for a third-party candidate or wrote in a candidate. These numbers show a small but definite shift towards the Democratic candidate when compared to the 2004 presidential election, in which 65.8% of Umatilla Country voters voted for George W. Bush, while 32.8% voted for John Kerry, and 1.4% of voters either voted for a third-party candidate or wrote in a candidate.

Economy
The gold rush of 1862 brought miners and stock raisers to the mountains and grasslands of Umatilla County. Another stimulus was the arrival of the railroad in 1881, opening the region to the development of dry-land wheat farming. Water for irrigation has been key to economic diversification and growth, most recently in the Hermiston area, where potatoes, onions, corn, and more than 200 other crops are grown commercially. Low-cost power through Umatilla Electric Cooperative and good freeway access are also driving growth in the Hermiston area, with amazon.com developing large data-center operations there, and major distribution facilities for Walmart, FedEx, and UPS are all located in Hermiston.

Communities

Umatilla County is generally divided into three distinct economic and cultural areas, which are the West End, the Pendleton area, and the Milton-Freewater area. Although each of these communities shares some economic ties, the distance between each creates three very distinct communities. The West End includes the communities of Hermiston, Umatilla, Stanfield, and Echo. The Pendleton area includes Pendleton, Pilot Rock, Adams, and Athena. The Milton-Freewater area is largely tied to the Walla Walla, Washington area, and is considered a part of the Walla Walla Metropolitan Planning Organization. The similarities between the areas has created a long-standing rivalry, particularly between the West-End and the Pendleton-area, with regard to economic opportunity and public resources. The West End, led by Hermiston as its largest city, is now nearly twice the size of the Pendleton area, and is projected to be nearly three times the size of the Pendleton area by 2035.

Cities

Adams
Athena
Echo
Helix
Hermiston
Milton-Freewater
Pendleton (county seat)
Pilot Rock
Stanfield
Ukiah
Umatilla
Weston

Census-designated places

Cayuse
Gopher Flats
Green Meadows
Kirkpatrick
McKay
Meacham
Mission
Riverside
Tutuilla
Umapine

Other unincorporated communities

Bingham Springs
Blakeley (ghost town)
Cold Springs
Cold Springs Junction
Ferndale
Gibbon
Havana
Hinkle
Holdman
Lehman Springs
McNary
Myrick
Nolin
Nye
Ordnance (ghost town)
Pine Grove
Power City
Rieth
Riverview (ghost town)
Sunnyside
Tollgate
Westland

Education
School districts include:
 Athena-Weston School District 29J
 Echo School District 5
 Helix School District 1
 Hermiston School District 8
 Milton-Freewater School District 7
 Pendleton School District 16
 Pilot Rock School District 2
 Stanfield School District 61
 Ukiah School District 80
 Umatilla School District 6

See also
National Register of Historic Places listings in Umatilla County, Oregon
 Umatilla County Fair

References

External links
 Umatilla County (official website)

 
1862 establishments in Oregon
Populated places established in 1862
Oregon placenames of Native American origin
Pendleton–Hermiston Micropolitan Statistical Area